Li Shu-fan (1887 – 24 November 1966) was a leader of the medical profession in Hong Kong and a member of the Legislative Council of Hong Kong.

Biography

He was a native of China but received his early education in the US. Li graduated from the Hong Kong College of Medicine in 1908. In 1910 he obtained the M.B., Ch.B at the University of Edinburgh.

Li was the Minister of Public Health under Sun Yat-sen (a fellow alumnus of the Hong Kong College of Medicine). He was the head of the Canton Kung Yee University Medical School in Guangzhou (then called Canton) from 1923–1924; he treated Mikhail Borodin at this time. In 1926, he was named to head the Yeung Wo Nursing Home, which under his leadership was reorganized and renamed to the Hong Kong Sanatorium and Hospital.  He retired from medical practice in 1958, but remained Chairman of the Board and Medical Superintendent until his death in 1966. His younger brother Li Shu Pui succeeded him as Superintendent.

He was a member of the Hong Kong Legislative Council from 1937-1941.

In 1961 he donated land, estimated value 250,000 pounds, to the University of Hong Kong. A year later, he gave his life earnings (more than 80% of the shares of the Hong Kong Sanatorium) to establish the Li Shu Fan Medical Foundation for medical research and education was established in March 1962.

In 1964, he published his autobiography, Hong Kong Surgeon.

Buildings at the University of Hong Kong and Hong Kong Sanatorium & Hospital are named for him.

References

Additional sources 
 University of Hong Kong, Growing With Hong Kong: The University and Its Graduates, the First 90 Years : A Convocation Project, pp. 50, 113. excerpts
 Li Shu Fan, Hong Kong Surgeon, 1964. reviewed in Chest 45:4:448 
 T. C. Cheng, "Chinese Unofficial Members of the Legislative and Executive Councils in Hong Kong up to 1941", Journal of the Hong Kong Branch of the Royal Asiatic Society 9, 1969. (A lecture delivered to the Branch on 29 April 1968) full text

Alumni of the University of Edinburgh
Hong Kong medical doctors
Members of the Legislative Council of Hong Kong
Members of the Sanitary Board of Hong Kong
Members of the Urban Council of Hong Kong
1887 births
1966 deaths
Date of birth missing
Place of birth missing
Place of death missing
Politicians from Jiangmen
Republic of China politicians from Guangdong
Physicians from Guangdong
Chinese expatriates in the United States
Chinese emigrants to British Hong Kong